William Perrin Ross (January 28, 1915 - September 3, 1995) was an American art director and production designer. He won one Primetime Emmy Award and was nominated for one more in the category Outstanding Art Direction for his work on the television program Mission: Impossible. 

Ross died in September 1995 at the Mercy Hospital in Kern County, California, at the age of 80.

References

External links 

1915 births
1995 deaths
People from Wilkes-Barre, Pennsylvania
American art directors
American production designers
Primetime Emmy Award winners